Velles may refer to the following places in France:

Velles, Indre, a commune in the Indre department 
Velles, Haute-Marne, a commune in the Haute-Marne department